Utricularia humboldtii is a large perennial carnivorous plant that belongs to the genus Utricularia. Peter Taylor lists it as either an "aquatic-epiphyte", a subaquatic or a terrestrial species. U. humboldtii is endemic to South America, where it is found in Brazil, Guyana, and Venezuela. It was originally published and described by Robert Hermann Schomburgk in 1840. It is usually found growing in the water-filled leaf axils of some species of bromeliad, including Brocchinia micrantha, B. tatei, and B. reducta and also plants in the genus Orectanthe. It also grows as an epiphyte on tree trunks or as a subaquatic or terrestrial species in shallow water or wet soil in open savanna. It has been collected in flower throughout every month of the year.

U. humboldtii possess the largest flower of the genus and most likely also the largest bladder traps. As it usually lives within the water-filled leaf axils of bromeliads, it occasionally needs to search for new pools of water, so it sends out upright stolons that find nearby bromeliads, descend into the water, and grow into a new plant.

See also 
 List of Utricularia species

References 

Carnivorous plants of South America
Flora of Brazil
Flora of Guyana
Flora of Venezuela
humboldtii
Epiphytes
Taxa named by Robert Hermann Schomburgk